This is a list of singles that charted in the top ten of the Billboard Hot 100 during 1995.

Boyz II Men scored five top ten hits during the year with "I'll Make Love to You", "On Bended Knee", "Water Runs Dry", "Hey Lover", and "One Sweet Day", the most among all other artists.

Top-ten singles
Key
 – indicates single's top 10 entry was also its Hot 100 debut

1994 peaks

1996 peaks

See also
1995 in music
List of Hot 100 number-one singles of 1995 (U.S.)
Billboard Year-End Hot 100 singles of 1995

References

General sources

Joel Whitburn Presents the Billboard Hot 100 Charts: The Nineties
Additional information obtained can be verified within Billboard's online archive services and print editions of the magazine.

1995
United States Hot 100 Top Ten Singles